Mina Pandey (also Meena, also Pande; born 11 May 1952, in Bethan-2, Ramechhap) is a Nepali politician and a member of the House of Representatives of the Federal Parliament of Nepal. She is also a member of the State Affairs and Good Governance Committee of the parliament. She was elected from Nepali Congress under the proportional representation system.

In the 2013 Constituent Assembly election, she was a candidate for Nepali Congress in the Sarlahi-2 constituency.

References

Living people
21st-century Nepalese women politicians
21st-century Nepalese politicians
Nepali Congress politicians from Madhesh Province
1952 births
People from Ramechhap District
Nepal MPs 2017–2022
Nepal MPs 1991–1994
Nepal MPs 1994–1999

Members of the 1st Nepalese Constituent Assembly